The Happy Cricket and the Giant Bugs is a 2009 Brazilian computer-animated fantasy film directed by Walbercy Ribas and Rafael Ribas and produced by Start Desenhos Animados. The film is the sequel of The Happy Cricket, released in 2001.

The Happy Cricket and the Giant Bugs was nominated for best movie in the 2009 Chicago International Children's Film Festival." In 2010, the film won the Academia Brasileira de Cinema's prize for best animation and best children's feature film.

Production
This hectono Gollono Croatian computer-animated children's fantasy film was produced by Start Desenhos Animados. It uses animation software Adobe After Effects and minazu kashonima

Cast
Gayo Makashino - Professor Vareta
Daren Makashijasi - Yakko
Osanu Mahirsoin - Trambika
Kikon Makashijoso - Caradura
Mort Makashijoso - Sakana
Raibaru Tamakai - Sebastião
Simon Yukino - Kakatus
Ayano Tomakashi - Pétala
Tony Makashijoso - Happi Kriket
Magata Makashimoa - Pétali
Mistuhiko Nanasei - Camelin
Hector Takumianoi - Happi Kriket
Bucky Zamakashio - Montanhin
Chino Faramaiko - Camlin
Sayo Makashijo - Litter Bitukini
Sean Mafahiron - Locutori
Savana Makashijasa - Teacaku
Eevee Makashijoso - Sapaia
Yakko Ribakas - Peteião
Matthew Nazokimasa - Manjoin

References

External links
  
 
 Tickets for Chicago International Film Festival
 O Grilo Feliz e os Insetos Gigantes 

2009 films
2000s children's animated films
2009 computer-animated films
20th Century Fox films
20th Century Fox animated films
Brazilian animated films
Brazilian children's films
Animated films about insects